Gulf War: Operation Desert Hammer is an action game developed and published by The 3DO Company in 1999.

Gameplay
The game has M1 Tanks during the Gulf War, and it is one of the first games about Desert Storm and features Saddam Hussein as a final enemy.

Reception

The game received mixed reviews according to the review aggregation website GameRankings. John Lee of NextGen said of the game, "There's some entertaining play here, but it doesn't last long. The missions get monotonous. You drive around in 3D sand and blow up tanks and trucks and buildings. And that's about it. In fact, it's rare to find such an arcade-style action game on PC, and playing this shows why."

References

External links
 Strife Guide Review
 

1999 video games
Action video games
Cultural depictions of Saddam Hussein
Gulf War video games
North America-exclusive video games
Tank simulation video games
The 3DO Company games
Video games developed in the United States
Video games set in 1991
Video games set in Iraq
Windows games
Windows-only games